St. Stephen's Church  is a historic Episcopal church located in Brady's Bend Township, Armstrong County, Pennsylvania.   It was built in 1867, and is a one-story, sandstone building in the Gothic Revival style. It is 36 feet wide and 68 feet deep, with a steeply pitched gable roof. It was transformed in 1925 to serve as a community meeting hall.

It was listed on the National Register of Historic Places in 1980.

References

Churches on the National Register of Historic Places in Pennsylvania
Episcopal churches in Pennsylvania
Gothic Revival church buildings in Pennsylvania
Churches completed in 1867
Churches in Armstrong County, Pennsylvania
19th-century Episcopal church buildings
National Register of Historic Places in Armstrong County, Pennsylvania